CJUV-FM is a Canadian radio station that broadcasts a classic hits format at 94.1 FM in Lacombe, Alberta.

In December 2015, the station was sold by its founder, L.A. Radio Group, to Golden West Broadcasting.

References

External links

English-language FM radio station in Lacombe - Broadcasting Decision CRTC 2006-71

JUV
Lacombe, Alberta
JUV
Radio stations established in 2006
2006 establishments in Alberta